Sandgate may refer to:
In Australia
Sandgate, Randwick, a heritage-listed house in Randwick, New South Wales
Sandgate, New South Wales, Australia
Sandgate, Queensland, Australia
Electoral district of Sandgate, Queensland, Australia
Sandgate Post Office
Sandgate railway station, Brisbane
Sandgate Town Hall

In the United Kingdom
Sandgate, Kent, England
Sandgate Castle
Sandgate, an area east of Newcastle upon Tyne, referenced in the song "The Keel Row"; see Newcastle upon Tyne#16th to 19th centuries

In the United States
Sandgate, Vermont, USA